Berrón Club de Fútbol is a Spanish football club based in El Berrón, Siero, in the autonomous community of Asturias.

History
Founded in 1969, Berrón made their debut in Tercera División in 1993, only remaining one season. The club came back to the fourth tier and played two more seasons between 2004 and 2006 before being relegated again to the Regional leagues.

Stadium
Berrón plays its games at the Estadio Sergio Sánchez, with natural grass and renamed after the death of the 18-year old player during a training with the club.

The facilities have another pitch of artificial turf for its reserve and youth teams, inaugurated in 2016.

Season to season

3 seasons in Tercera División

References

External links
Official website 

Football clubs in Asturias
Association football clubs established in 1969
1969 establishments in Spain